Marius Wegmann (born 3 September 1998) is a German footballer who plays as a centre-back for Regionalliga Bayern club Würzburger Kickers.

References

External links
 

1998 births
Living people
German footballers
Association football defenders
FC Rot-Weiß Erfurt players
FV Illertissen players
Würzburger Kickers players
3. Liga players
Regionalliga players
People from Pfullendorf
Sportspeople from Tübingen (region)
Footballers from Baden-Württemberg